Michael Cole "Mike" Jensen (born November 30, 1939) is an American economist who works in the area of financial economics. Between 2000 and 2009 he worked for the Monitor Company Group,
a strategy-consulting firm which became "Monitor Deloitte" in 2013.
He holds the position of Jesse Isidor Straus Professor of Business Administration, Emeritus, at Harvard University.

Early life
Born in Rochester, Minnesota, United States, he received his A.B. in Economics from Macalester College in 1962. He received both his M.B.A. (1964) and Ph.D. (1968) degrees from the University of Chicago Booth School of Business, notably working with Professor Merton Miller (1990 co-winner of the Nobel Prize in Economics).

Career
Between 1967 and 1988, Jensen taught finance and business administration at the William E. Simon Graduate School of Business Administration of the University of Rochester, culminating in his 1984-1988 appointment as the LaClare Professor of Finance and Business Administration. From 1977 to 1988, he served as the founding director of the University's Managerial Economics Research Center. He joined the Harvard Business School on a half-time appointment in 1985 (dividing his time between Rochester and Harvard) before taking a full-time appointment at the latter institution in 1988. He cofounded the Social Science Research Network in 1994. In 2000, Jensen retired from academic work, retaining emeritus status at Harvard, upon assuming his position at Monitor.

He was also a visiting scholar at the University of Bern (1976), Harvard University (1984–1985, when he joined the faculty), and the Tuck School of Business at Dartmouth College (2001–2002). In 1992, he held the chair of president of the American Finance Association. He became a member of the American Academy of Arts and Sciences in 1996. Since 2002, he has been a board member of the European Corporate Governance Institute. Jensen is also the founder and editor of the Journal of Financial Economics.

The Jensen Prize in corporate finance and organizations research is named in his honor.

Research
He has played an important role in the academic discussion of the capital asset pricing model, of stock options policy, and of corporate governance. He developed a method of measuring fund manager performance, the so-called Jensen's alpha.

Jensen's best-known work is the 1976 paper he co-authored with William H. Meckling, Theory of the Firm: Managerial Behavior, Agency Costs and Ownership Structure. One of the most widely cited economics papers of the last 40 years, it implied the theory of the public corporation as an ownerless entity, made up of only contractual relationships, a field pioneered by Ronald Coase.

His 1983 paper Reflections on the Corporation as a Social Invention argued that corporations' sole responsibility was to shareholder value via short-term stock price increases.

It was a 1990 Harvard Business Review article, CEO Incentives: It's Not How Much You Pay, But How by Jensen and Kevin J. Murphy, that prescribed executive stock options to maximize shareholder value.  The justification they gave was that shareholders were the "residual claimants" of the corporation so they had the sole right to profits. The idea that shareholders are the sole residual claimants was later challenged by legal scholars, and some (such as Stout 2002) actively reject it, in favor of other arguments for shareholder primacy. However, recent literature (such as Rojas 2014) builds upon Jensen's work arguing in favor of a dynamic model of the corporation and theory of corporate governance.

After Jensen and Murphy (1990), Congress passed Section 162(m) of the U.S. Internal Revenue Code (1993), making it cost effective to pay executives in equity. As a result, executives had a financial incentive to focus their efforts on increasing stock price. In the short run, some executives even manipulated accounting numbers (Enron, Global Crossing) to achieve the goal.

Jensen has collaborated several times with Werner Erhard. The backbone of their study is an ontological/phenomenological model.

References

External links

 Personal page at the Harvard Business School website
 Author page at the SSRN (Social Science Research Network) website
 BEING A LEADER & THE EFFECTIVE EXERCISE OF LEADERSHIP: An Ontological/Phenomenological Model 

1939 births
American economists
Fellows of the American Academy of Arts and Sciences
Harvard Business School faculty
Living people
Place of birth missing (living people)
University of Chicago Booth School of Business alumni
Presidents of the American Finance Association